Renotus deyrollei is a species of beetle in the family Noteridae, the only species in the genus Renotus.

References

Noteridae